The Carlos Palanca Memorial Awards for Literature winners for 2014. The awarding ceremonies were held on September 1, 2014, at the Peninsula Hotel Manila in Makati.

Awards

Hall of Fame

Dr. Alice Tan Gonzales
Mr. Rodolfo "Rody" Vera

Filipino division

Dulang Pampelikula (Screenplay)
Panel of Judges: Mr. Rolando B. Tolentino (Chair), Dr. Rustica C. Carpio, Mr. Mark Meily

1st: Lakambini by Mr. Rodolfo C. Vera Lakambini
2nd: Ang Pag-ikot ng Salapi sa Panahon ni JLC by Mr. Andrian M. Legaspi                                  
3rd: That thing called Tadhana by Ms. Antoinette H. Jadaone

Dulang Ganap Ang Haba (Full-length play)
Panel of Judges: Mr. Elmer L. Gatchalian (Chair), Ms. Banaue Miclat-Janssen, Mr. Perci Intalan

1st: Tungkol kay Angela by Mr. Joshua L. Lim So                                     
2nd: Shambala by Mr. Erick Dasig Aguilar
3rd: Agimat by Mr. Peter Solis Nery

Dulang May Isang Yugto (One Act Play)
Panel of Judges: Mr. Manuel R. Buising (Chair), Mr. Marlon Rivera, Mr. Fernando  Josef

1st: Gladiolas by Mr. Peter Solis Nery                                      
2nd: Balediksiyon by Mr. Salvador Biglaen                                     
3rd: Sa Syquia, Malate, Kabanata I: Maraming Nagugutom sa Pilipinas by Mr. Joshua L. Lim So

Tula (Poetry)
Panel of Judges: Ms. Luna Sicat-Cleto (Chair), Mr. Rofel G. Brion, Ms. Marra PL. Lanot

1st: Paglasa sa Pansamantala by Mr. Vijae Orquia Alquisola
2nd: Marina by Mr. Enrique S. Villasis
3rd: Musikerong Bulag by Mr. Jose Marte A. Abueg

Tula Para Sa Mga Bata (Poetry written for children)
Panel of Judges: Mr. Rogelio G. Mangahas (Chair), Dr. Fely Pado, Mr. Virgilio V. Vitug

1st: Tugma at Sukat sa Panahon ng Pagmulat by Mr. Edgardo B. Maranan
2nd: Sa Tuwing Ikaw ay Tahimik at mga Tinig ng Mga Batang Tinutukso by Mr. Vijae Orquia Alquisola
3rd: Lola Manghuhula by Mr. John Enrico C. Torralba

Maikling Kwento (Short story)
'Panel of Judges: Mr. Rosauro Q. Dela Cruz (Chair), Prof. Patrocinio V. Villafuerte, Dr. Rhoderick V. Nuncio

1st: Ang Bugtong ng Manok at Agila by Mr. Alvin B. Yapan
2nd: Grace by Mr. Peter Jairron C. Cruz
3rd: Nando by Mr. Emmanuel T. Barrameda

Maikling Kuwentong Pambata (Short story for children)
Panel of Judges:  Prof. Rolando S. Dela Cruz (Chair), Ms. Yna Reyes, Mr. Segundo D. Matias, Jr.

1st: Ang Nag-iisa at Natatanging si Onyok by Mr. Eugene Y. Evasco
2nd: NO WINNER
3rd: NO WINNER

Sanaysay (Essay)
Panel of Judges: Ms. Ma. Milagros C. Laurel (Chair), Ms. Sol Juvida, Prof. Jovy M. Peregrino

1st: Return Flight by Mr. Allan B. Lopez
2nd: Retorika ng Luksa by Ms. Dayang Magdalena Nirvana T. Yraola
3rd: Ang Daigdig sa Ilalim ng Papag ni Lola Mude by Mr. Jose Dennis C. Teodosio

English division

Full-length play
Panel of Judges: Dr. Rosario O. Lapus (Chair), Mr. Anthony Buencamino, Ms. Menchu Lauchengco-Yulo

1st: NO WINNER
2nd: The Last Filipino by Mr. Joachim Emilio B. Antonio
3rd: NO WINNER

One Act Play
Panel of Judges: Mr. Nestor O. Jardin (Chair), Ms. Sonia M. Roco, Dr. Jerry C. Respeto

1st: How I Got My Black Leather Boots by Mr. Patrick John R. Valencia
2nd: Killing the Issue by Mr. Karlo Antonio Galay-David
3rd: Photo Finish by Ms. Erlinda Mae T. Young

Poetry
Panel of Judges: Mr. Alfred A. Yuson (Chair), Ms. Elsa Martinez Coscolluela, Ms. Marjorie Evasco

1st: We Won’t Be Tending Gardens by Ms.Ana Maria Katigbak-Lacuesta
2nd: Nausea and Other Poems by Mr. Noli Manaig
3rd: This Tender Gravity by Mr. Mikael de Lara Co

Poetry written for children
Panel of Judges: Mr. Ramon C. Sunico (Chair), Ms. Heidi Emily Eusebio-Abad, Ms. Carla M. Pacis

1st: NO WINNER
2nd: Punny Poems by Ms. Elyrah Salanga-Torralba
3rd: Those Colorful Parts by Mr. Peter Solis Nery

Short story
Panel of Judges: Ms. Rica Bolipata-Santos (Chair), Ms. Emily Abrera, Dr. Jose Y. Dalisay, Jr.

1st: The Auroras by Ms. Sasha Martinez
2nd: Zurbaran by Ms. Maria Carmen A. Sarmiento
3rd: Eye Candy by Ms. Sarah Lumba-Tajonera

Short story for children
Panel of Judges: Ms. Nina Lim-Yuson (Chair), Ms. Cyan Abad-Jugo, Mr. Luis Katigbak

1st: Hiro the Rooster and Basha the Hen by Mr. Jose Carlo O. Sevilla
2nd: Three Good Things by Ms. Kathleen Aton-Osias
3rd: The Ragpicker’s Son by Ms. Catherine Rose Torres

Essay
Panel of Judges: Mr. Danton R. Remoto(Chair), Ms. Ma. Karina A. Bolasco, Mr. Baltazar N. Endriga

1st: The Salt Price by Ms. Ma. Nicola Loretto M. Sebastian
2nd: (Insert her Silence Here) by Ms. Shakira Andrea C. Sison
3rd: When One is the Fourth of Ten by Ms. Terra J. Daffon

Regional division

Cebuano

Panel of Judges: Ms. Ada J. Loredo (Chair), Dr. Isabel D. Sebullen, Mr. Edgar H. Siscar

1st: Gutom by Mr. Noel P. Tuazon
2nd: Utlanan by Mr. Marcelo D. Baterna
3rd: Kasina by Dr.Jondy Medalle Arpilleda

Hiligaynon

Panel of Judges: Mr. Edgar H. Siscar (Chair), Dr. Carmencita R. Abayan, Dr. Hope Sabanpan-Yu

1st: Balay sang Monyeka by Dr. Alice Tan Gonzales
2nd: Olayra by Mr. Norman Tagudinay Darap
3rd: NO WINNER

Ilokano

Panel of Judges: Dr. Adelaida F. Lucero (Chair), Mr. Leonardo Q. Belen, Mr. Aurelio S. Agcaoili, Ph.D.

1st: NO WINNER
2nd: Gapu Ken ni Angelica by Ms. Ronelyn Ramones
3rd: Mennamenna ti Maysa a Mannurat iti Ipupusayna, Iti Maysa a Nadagaang A Malem by Mr. Roy V. Aragon

Kabataan division

Panel of Judges: Ms. Kara David (Chair), Mr. Edizon A. Fermin, Ms. Lilibeth R. Oblena-Quiore

Kabataan sanaysay
1st: Bago Pa Tuluyang Maligaw by Ms. Pamela A. Mendoza 
2nd: NO WINNER
3rd: NO WINNER

Kabataan essay
1st: Avoiding the Fate of Gregor Samsa by Mr. Harvey James G. Castillo                                   
2nd: Adrift on a Promise by Ms. Vicah Adrienne P. Villanueva                  
3rd:  The Unwritten Rule by Mr. John Jason Berangel Santillan

References 

Literary Artists prevail in 64th Palanca Awards

External links 
Carlos Palanca Memorial Awards for Literature

2014
Palanca
2014 in the Philippines